The Canada West Foundation is a non-partisan think tank based in Calgary, Alberta. It primarily conducts research on issues of concern in British Columbia, Alberta, Saskatchewan and Manitoba, but also on issues of national significance.

The foundation emphasizes it has an evidence-based, non-partisan approach to research.

The foundation focuses on research and convening stakeholders to improve the prosperity, sustainability and quality of life for the citizens of Canada's four western provinces, and to educate Canadians on western Canadian contributions and aspirations.

Three Research Centres

Natural Resources, Trade & Investment, Human Capital
After a deep program review in 2012-13, the foundation decided to focus on three key areas of research: human capital, natural resources and trade and investment. In 2013, the Foundation established three new research centres: the Natural Resources Centre, the Trade & Investment Centre and the Human Capital Centre.

Through its three centres, it looks for practical solutions to the challenges that face western Canada, including getting products to markets around the world; building a stronger, more versatile workforce; and finding ways to build public support for the region's key natural resource industries: forestry, agri-food, mining, and oil and natural gas.

History
The Canada West Foundation was founded Dec. 31, 1970. Founding members include George Maxwell Bell (1912-1972), Arthur Child (1910-1996), Frederick C. Mannix (1913-) and Honourable James A. Richardson.

The idea of a western-focused thinking tank emerged during the One Prairie Province? A Question for Canada Conference, co-sponsored by the University of Lethbridge and the Lethbridge Herald in Lethbridge, Alberta, on May 10–13, 1970. Three papers were presented, including Strayer's paper on the Constitutional processes for a Prairie union. David Elton political science at the University of Lethbridge. published the conference proceedings in 1970 in the Lethbridge Herald.. Elton replaced Stan Roberts as president in 1980. He remained in that position until 1997 where he researched such topics as institutional reform and citizens' engagement. In this capacity he acted as witness in federal parliamentary committees on Finance advocating for zero deficit and cut-off income limits for social welfare funding.

Stan Roberts was president of the Canada West Foundation from 1976 to 1980. In this capacity, he took a leading role in arguing for the position of the west in Canada's constitutional debates.

In 1987 Francis Winspear, financed the Western Assembly on Canada's Economic and Political Future, (Patten 1997:40) organized by Preston Manning, Stan Roberts and Robert Muirheld and promoted by Ted Byfield, in Vancouver in 1987. Organizational support was provided by the Canada West Foundation. It was at this assembly that the Reform Party of Canada was launched. Winspear who was convinced that "mainline political parties no longer served the interest of Canadians," played a crucial role in the "founding and sustaining of the Reform Party of Canada." There were some within the Canada West Foundation who believed that Roberts himself was partly sympathetic to separatism; he never became affiliated with the movement, but was forced to step down as CWF President in December 1980 after some controversial statements on the subject. According to journalist, Norm Ovenden, under Roberts' presidency, by 1980, the Canada West Foundation had become a "powerhouse", a "prestige organization in just a decade." Ovenden credits Roberts with transforming a "low-key research organization" into a "well-known, widely respected pulse-takers of the Canadian west" in four years.

James K. Gray O.C., A.O.E., co-founder of Canadian Hunter Exploration, "one of Canada's largest and most successful natural gas companies." served as chair of the Canada West Foundation from 1994 to 2009 and as honorary chair.

Roger Gibbins, chairman and head of the political science department at the University of Calgary, served as president and CEO of the Canada West Foundation from 1999 until his retirement in June 2012. Gibbins was also a member of the Calgary School.

Dylan Jones was President and CEO of the Foundation, from June 2012 to May 2016. Jones was former Deputy Minister to Saskatchewan Premier Brad Wall. Jones was named Deputy Minister of Western Economic Diversification, effective June 20, 2016.

Martha Hall Findlay served as President and CEO of the Foundation from September 2016 to December 2019. Findlay previously served as a Liberal Member of Parliament in the Toronto riding of Willowdale from 2008 to 2011. Findlay was named Chief Sustainability Officer for Suncor at the beginning of 2020.

Gary Mar was named President and CEO on March 31, 2020.

Funding
The Foundation is a registered educational charity, funded through donations from charitable foundations, government, industry stakeholders and individual citizens. It also conducts research on behalf of clients. The Foundation has a reserve fund, from which it draws annual income.

Senate Reform
In late 1978, CWF President, Stan Roberts, expressed interest in Francis Winspear's proposed constitutional reforms, which included Senate reform and the equal treatment of all provinces. During this period, Roberts made several speeches warning about the possibility of western separatism. The four western provinces were vastly under-represented in Senate. In 2012 Manitoba, Saskatchewan, Albert and British Columbia has only six seats each in the 105-seat Senate chamber. Nova Scotia, Prince Edward Island, New Brunswick and Newfoundland, despite much smaller populations than the West, had a combined 30 seats. Ontario and Quebec each had 24 seat. The CWF promotes a Triple-E Senate that would be equal, elected, and effective. However, with Prime Minister Harper in power, "the West no longer wants in because it is in. Indeed, it occupies the Prime Minister's Office."

Western Cities Project
In 2000 the CWF published a report entitled A Roof Over Our Heads: Affordable Housing and Urban Growth in Western Canada. In 2008 the research was updated in a publication entitled Affordable Housing and Homelessness Policy in Canada funded by the Alberta Real Estate Foundation, the Urban Development Institute Alberta and the cities of Vancouver, Calgary, Edmonton, Saskatoon and Regina.

Canada-Asia Energy Futures Task Force
In September 2011, the Asia Pacific Foundation of Canada (APF Canada) and the Canada West Foundation established the Canada-Asia Energy Futures Task Force with Kathleen (Kathy) E. Sendall, C.M., FCAE, a former Governor and Board Chair of the Canadian Association of Petroleum Producers (CAPP) and Kevin G. Lynch, a Canadian economist and former Clerk of the Privy Council and Secretary to the Cabinet, Canada's most senior civil servant as co-chairs, to investigate a long-term Canada-Asia energy relationship. One of their recommendations was the creation of a public energy transportation corridor.

See also
Fraser Institute
Calgary School

Notes

References

External links
Canada West Foundation – Canadian Political Parties and Political Interest Groups – Web Archive created by the University of Toronto Libraries

University of Calgary
Politics of Alberta
Schools of economic thought
Non-profit organizations based in Alberta
Political and economic think tanks based in Canada
Conservatism in Canada
Organizations established in 1970
1970 establishments in Alberta